Alsodryas lactaria is a species of moth in the family Gelechiidae. It was described by Edward Meyrick in 1914. It is found in Guyana.

The wingspan is 10–12 mm. The forewings are ochreous-whitish, more or less sprinkled or faintly clouded with pale ochreous and with a black dot on the base of the costa and a small spot at one-fifth, the costal edge black between these. There is also a black subbasal dot near the costa and a slight suffused blackish wedge-shaped mark on the costa before the middle, as well as a larger one beyond the middle. A rather large transverse tuft of blackish-grey scales is found in the disc slightly before the middle, and one somewhat smaller at two-thirds. There are blackish-grey spots on the tornus and middle of the termen, and two or three indistinct blackish dots on the costa towards the apex. The hindwings are grey.

References

Anacampsinae
Moths described in 1914
Moths of South America